Jan Egil Brekke (born 14 June 1974) is a Norwegian football midfielder who most recently played for Alta IF.

He has played in the Norwegian Premier League for FK Bodø/Glimt and Tromsø IL.

He grew up in Karasjok, and is the brother of fellow footballer Leif Arne Brekke. He has played for the Sápmi national football team.

External links

Norwegian footballers
FK Bodø/Glimt players
Tromsdalen UIL players
Tromsø IL players
Alta IF players
Norwegian Sámi people
People from Karasjok
Norwegian Sámi sportspeople
1974 births
Living people
Association football midfielders
Sportspeople from Troms og Finnmark